Great Planes may refer to:

Great Planes Model Manufacturing, an American manufacturer of model planes
Wings (1988 TV program), originally titled Great Planes

See also
Great Plains (disambiguation)